Zimunya (alternatively also referred to as Zimunya Tribal Trust Land or Zimunya Reserve or Zimunya communal lands), also referred to by the Jindwi people of Zimunya as "Jindwi" (also referenced in other texts as "Jindui" or "Jindwe"), is a Paramount Chiefdom in Manicaland Province, Zimbabwe under Chief Zimunya.

Geographical location 
Zimunya stretches southward from the present day City of Mutare, past the Bvumba mountain range, through Burma Valley, Chitakatira, Dowa, Chitaka, Chitakatira, Rowa, Chinyauhwera, Munyarari, Mambwere, Mpudzi, Chimhenga, Chipendeke, Bwizi, Chitora, Gutaurare, Muromo, Masasi, Mukwada, Kusena, Chakohwa, Chiswingi, Chiadzwa, Mufusire heading southward to Wengezi, reaching towards Birchenough Bridge, sharing the border with Mocambique in the East, waBocha People under Chief Marange, waUngwe People under Chief Makoni, as well as the waHera in the west, the Ndau People to the south, with the Manyika People under Chief Mutasa to the north of Mutare. (Zimunya's pre-colonial eastern boundaries stretched into modern day Mocambique).

Approximately 15 km south of Mutare lies Zimunya Town within the Zimunya communal lands. This community is surrounded by the Bvumba Mountain range (Bvumba Mountains) and Fern Valley communities.

Population 
The indigenous population continues to live on farms and communal land along the length and breath of the Chiefdom, characterised by well watered mountain ranges, valleys, rivers, dams and forests, rich in flora growing in the richest soils in the region.

Languages 
The language spoken by the aJindwi is called chiJindwi (also referred to as CiJindwi in certain texts). chiJindwi continues to be spoken today, despite ill-conceived attempts by the then colonial regime (through Missionaries) to replace it with the language of chiManyika as well as to re-identify the indigenous people with a new identity the oppressors originated, crafted and called "Shona", as quoted by B.H. Barnes in the book 'The progress of the new Shona orthography', Native Affairs Department Annual, No. 12 (1934), referenced in "The Creation of Tribalism in Southern Africa".

In 1934 the Anglican missionary B. H. Barnes illustrated the situation with reference to language and ethnicity by taking the examples of the peoples of Chief Makoni of the Ungwe and Chief Zimunya of Jindwe:

"In our Mashonaland there is no single race and language which is definitely representative of the whole area. There are, instead, a large number of small tribes or clans, and almost as many divergent dialects. Any individual will declare himself to be of this or that clan and a speaker of this or that dialect. None calls himself Mashona and there is at present none who will say that his speech is Shona. You will find that he speaks CiUngwe or CiJindwi and belongs to the Ungwe or the WaJindwi. Either of these may claim to be Manyika and to speak CiManyika, but they know nothing of a Shona race or a Shona language. . . . In the various districts you will find that the lesser divisions are already able to recognize themselves as included under one or other of four or five principal groups, such as Karanga, Zezuru, Manyika, Ndau, Korekore. The process of unification has, in fact begun . . . [uniting] neighbouring sub-dialects under the main dialects."

As a result, chiJindwi is often incorrectly referred to as chiManyika or classified as a dialect of chiManyika, and yet chiJindwi has a unique origin, tradition and culture linked to its people.

References

Further reading 

 Shorn folklore: The Soko people of Zimbabwe, HODZA, Aaron C., HODZA, Folklore in Africa Today/Folklore en Afrique d’ aujourd' hui, Proceed ings of the Workshop/Actes du Colloque, Budapest, 1–4. XI. 1982., Budapest, African Research Project (Department of Folklore - ELTE), 1984: 417-429
 The Soko People
 Chinamora clan history

Manicaland Province